The Anatolian Biogeographic Region is a biogeographic region of Turkey, as defined by the European Environment Agency .

Extent

The Anatolian Biogeographic Region covers the interior and east of Anatolia, and excludes the coastal areas along the Black Sea and Mediterranean. 
It includes the central Anatolian Plateau, the Pontic and Taurus mountains and northern Mesopotamia.
It is an area of recently folded mountains formed from sedimentary rocks from the Paleozoic to Quaternary (539 million years ago to the present).

The area is geologically unstable and very prone to earthquakes.
The main rivers are the Euphrates, Tigris, Kizilirmak and Sakarya.

Environment

Most of the area receives low levels of precipitation. 
There are large differences in temperature between summer and winter.
The region provides a biogeographical transition between Europe and Asia, and is home to several mammals originating in North Africa or Asia.
There are many endemic species of flora adapted to xerophytic and salt steppe conditions.
Threats to biodiversity include agriculture, over-grazing, exotic species, dams and drainage projects.

Notes

Sources

Environment of Turkey
Biogeography
Mount Ararat